Romanian major scale, also known as lydian dominant flat 2 or flat 9, is a musical scale, noted for its flattened 2nd and sharpened fourth degrees, the latter a distinctive feature of Romanian traditional music. A C Romanian major scale has the notes C, D, E, F, G, A, B, which is 1, 2, 3, 4, 5, 6, 7.  Though it is called a major scale, it is typically played over a C13 (9) (11) (also F major over C) dominant chord. This is an enharmonic mode of B Harmonic Minor (A# & C# in B Harmonic Minor, Bb & Db in C Romanian Major), along with D Harmonic Major (C# in G Harmonic Major, Db in C Romanian Major). The root note of F Harmonic Major is raised a semitone to F#, and the root note of D Aeolian Dominant lowered a semitone to Db. There is also a ♮6 with the Db Super Lydian Augmented scale, lowering the B♮ to Bb. 

Romanian major's notes are the same as a half-whole diminished scale (C, D, E, E, F, G, A, B) but with no E (or 3rd position). Therefore, this scale should have diminished seventh chords, particularly from its second note. This scale's 4th and 6th notes have minor or major (dominant) chord, while the root only has a major (dominant) chord (distinction from the half-whole diminished scale that the root, 3rd, 4th, and 6th notes have full diminished, half diminished, minor, and dominant chords built from that scale).

The 5th mode, Jazz minor flat 5, also known as Jeth's Mode, is a jazz minor or melodic minor scale with a flattened 5th,  and is named after Dutch composer Willem Jeths. It can also be thought of as a whole half diminished scale omitting the augmented fifth. It can be used for soloing instead of regular jazz minor. The Jazz minor flat 5 mode in C contains the notes C, D, E, F, G , A, B, which has the formula 1, 2, 3, 4, 5, 6, 7. This is an enharmonic mode of E Harmonic Minor (D# & F# in E Harmonic Minor, Eb & Gb in C Jeth's Mode), along with G Harmonic Major (F# in G Harmonic Major, Gb in C Jeth's Mode). The root note of Bb Harmonic Major is raised a semitone to B♮, and the root note of G Aeolian Dominant lowered a semitone to Gb. There is also a ♮6 with the Gb Super Lydian Augmented scale, lowering the E♮ to Eb.

Modes
The scale contains the following modes:

{| class="wikitable"
|-
! align="center" | Mode
! align="center" | Name of scale
! colspan="8" align="center" | Degrees
! colspan="8" |Notes (in  
C Romanian Major)
!Chords
|-
| align="center" | 1
| Romanian Major Scale ||   1 || 2 || 3 || 4 || 5 || 6 || 7 || 8
|C
|D
|E
|F
|G
|A
|B
|C
|C(7,9,#11,13)  
|-
| align="center" | 2
| Super Lydian Augmented ♮6/
Nohkan #2
|  1 ||  2 || 3 || 4 || 5 || 6 || 7 || 8
|D
|E
|F
|G
|A
|B
|C
|D
|Ddim7 or 
DmM75
|-
| align="center" | 3
| Locrian ♮27 ||   1 || 2 || 3 || 4 || 5 || 6 || 7 || 8
|E
|F
|G
|A
|B
|C
|D
|E
|Edim7
|-
| align="center" | 4
| Istrian [heptatonic]/
Altered Dominant 6/Blues Phrygian 4
|   1 ||   2 || 3 || 4 || 5 || 6 || 7 || 8
|F
|G
|A
|B
|C
|D
|E
|F
|Fm or F(7,9, 9, 11) 
|-
| align="center" | 5
| Jazz Minor 5 
(Jeth's Mode)
|   1 || 2 || 3 || 4 || 5 || 6 || 7 || 8
|G
|A
|B
|C
|D
|E
|F
|G
|Gdim7 or 

GmM75
|-
| align="center" | 6
| Javanese 4/
Superphrygian ♮6
|   1 ||  2 || 3 || 4 || 5 || 6 || 7 || 8
|A
|B
|C
|D
|E
|F
|G
|A
|Am or A(7,9,9,13)
|-
| align="center" | 7
| Lydian Augmented 3 ||   1 || 2 || 3|| 4 || 5 || 6 || 7 || 8
|B
|C
|D
|E
|F
|G
|A
|B
|Bdim7 or 

BmM75
|}

See also
Hungarian major scale (the reversed version of the Romanian major scale)
Lydian dominant scale
Ukrainian Dorian (Romanian minor) scale

References

Heptatonic scales